A vision statement is an inspirational statement of an idealistic emotional future of a company or group. Vision describes the basic human emotion that a founder intends to be experienced by the people the organization interacts with.

Vision statements may fill the following functions for a company:
 Serve as foundations for a broader strategic plan.
 Motivate existing employees and attract potential employees by clearly categorizing the company's goals and attracting like-minded individuals.
 Focus company efforts and facilitate the creation of core competencies by directing the company to only focus on strategic opportunities that advance the company's vision.
 Help companies differentiate from competitors. 

A consensus does not exist on the characteristics of a "good" or "bad" vision statement.  Commonly cited traits include:
 concise: able to be easily remembered and repeated
 clear: defines a prime goal
 Time horizon: defines a time horizon
 future-oriented: describes where the company is going rather than the current state
 stable: offers a long-term perspective and is unlikely to be impacted by market or technology changes
 challenging: not something that can be easily met and discarded
 abstract: general enough to encompass all of the organization's interests and strategic direction
 inspiring: motivates employees and is something that employees view as desirable

See also 
 Strategic planning
 Mission statement
 Strategy Markup Language

References

Business terms
Statements
Strategic management